The Roman Catholic Diocese of Sobral is a diocese located in the city of Sobral in the Ecclesiastical province of Fortaleza in Brazil.

History
 November 10, 1915: Established as Diocese of Sobral from the Diocese of Ceará

Bishops
 Bishops of Sobral (Roman rite)
José Tupinambá da Frota (1916.01.24 – 1923.04.06)
João José da Mota e Albuquerque (1961.02.28 – 1964.04.28), appointed Archbishop of São Luís do Maranhão
Walfrido Teixeira Vieira (1965.01.06 – 1998.03.18)
Aldo de Cillo Pagotto, S.S.S. (1998.03.18 – 2004.05.05), appointed Archbishop of Paraíba 
Fernando Antônio Saburido, O.S.B. (2005.05.18 – 2009.07.01), appointed Archbishop of Olinda e Recife, Pernambuco
Odelir José Magri, M.C.C.I. (2010.10.11 - 2015.02.14), appointed Bishop of Chapecó, Santa Catarina
José Luiz Gomes de Vasconcelos (2015.07.08 - present)

Coadjutor bishop
Aldo de Cillo Pagotto, S.S.S. (1997-1998)

Auxiliary bishop
José Bezerra Coutinho (1956-1961), appointed Bishop of Estância, Sergipe

References
 GCatholic.org
 Catholic Hierarchy

Roman Catholic dioceses in Brazil
Christian organizations established in 1915
Sobral, Roman Catholic Diocese of
Roman Catholic dioceses and prelatures established in the 20th century